Celebration on the Grand was a free music festival held in Grand Rapids, Michigan to celebrate the quality of life in the Grand River valley and to act as an unofficial end to the summer for Grand Rapids.  It included a fireworks display.  The event was held annually on the weekend following Labor Day weekend.   Celebration on the Grand (COTG) was organized by a board of directors, committee members and event staff who all volunteer their time.

The first Celebration on the Grand took place in 1980 as a part of the events that opened the Gerald R. Ford Presidential Museum, the Amway Grand Plaza Hotel, and the Grand Rapids Art Museum's move to the old Federal Building.

Funding was provided by corporate sponsorships, private donations and fund raising activities held by COTG volunteers during the event.

In 2015, the Celebration on the Grand organization dissolved, ending the festival after more than 30 years.

References

External links
 Celebration on the Grand website
 Mlive Sep 10, 2009
 ArtPrize 2009 winner Ran Ortner to design Celebration on the Grand 2010 poster
 2009 Celebration on the Grand Photos
 Annual Celebration on the Grand is all about downtown fun

Music festivals in Michigan
Culture of Grand Rapids, Michigan
Tourist attractions in Grand Rapids, Michigan